Dilataria is a genus of gastropods belonging to the family Clausiliidae.

The species of this genus are found in Mediterranean.

Species:

Dilataria boettgeriana 
Dilataria bosnica 
Dilataria marcki 
Dilataria pirostoma 
Dilataria succineata

References

Clausiliidae